The U20 women's race at the 2023 World Athletics Cross Country Championships was held at the Bathurst in Australia, on February 18, 2023. Senayet Getachew from Ethiopia won the gold medal by 7 seconds over Ethiopian Medina Eisa, while Pamela Kosgei finished third.

Race results

U20 women's race (6 km)

Individual

Team

References

World Athletics Cross Country Championships